His Hero Is Gone was an influential American neo-crust band from Memphis, Tennessee. The band formed in 1995 from members of Copout, Man With Gun Lives Here, Union of Uranus and FaceDown. They disbanded in 1999, playing their last show in Memphis. They toured the U.S. extensively several times, as well as Europe and Japan.

History
His Hero Is Gone released a total of 6 records. Simultaneously or afterwards band members played in the bands Deathreat, Severed Head of State, Call The Police, Dimlaia, Warcry, Union of Uranus and more. Todd Burdette, Paul Burdette, and Yannick Lorrain went on to form the hardcore punk band Tragedy. His Hero is Gone was characterized by heavily distorted "thick sounding" guitars and lyrics featuring social commentary, including anti-consumerism. The band and related projects have remained under the radar of a mainstream audience by not promoting themselves via tools of mass communication such as websites or larger music labels.

Members
Todd Burdette — guitar, vocals - Also of Tragedy, Deathreat, Severed Head of State and Warcry, Formerly of Copout and Call The Police
Carl Auge — bass, vocals - Also of Syndromes, and formerly of Man With Gun Lives Here, Sob Story, Dimlaia, I Love a Parade, Drain the Sky
Paul Burdette — drums -  Also of Tragedy, Deathreat and Criminal Damage, Formerly of Face Down and Call The Police
Yannick Lorrain — guitar - Also of Tragedy, formerly of Union of Uranus
Pat Davis — guitar, vocals - Also of Hellthrasher and formerly of Sob Story

Discography
Studio albums
Fifteen Counts of Arson LP (1996, Prank)
Monuments to Thieves LP (1997, Prank)
The Plot Sickens LP  (1998, The Great American Steak Religion)

Extended plays
Medicine of Thieves demo tape (1995, Partners on Crime)
The Dead of Night in Eight Movements 7" (1996, Prank)
 Split E.P. 12" with Union Of Uranus (1998, The Great American Steak Religion)
Fools Gold 7"  (1998, The Great American Steak Religion) (Released in Europe through Coalition Records)

Compilation appearances
Complacency 7" (1997, Tuttle) - "Skinfeast"
Cry Of Soul 7" (1998, Crow) - "Disinformation Age"
Fiesta Comes Alive LP (1998, Slap-A-Ham) - "T-Minus Zero"

References

External links

Prank Records label that released their first two albums

American crust and d-beat groups
American sludge metal musical groups
Hardcore punk groups from Tennessee
Musical groups from Memphis, Tennessee
Musical groups established in 1995
Musical groups disestablished in 1999